Celia Campos Díaz (6 October 1922 – 18 June 1982), known as Chela Campos, was a Mexican singer and actress.

Career 
Campos was a beautiful woman gifted with a sensual voice. Campos rose to fame in the 1940s as a successful bolero performer.

Campos made her radio debut at the XEFO station and later won a contract to sing on the XEW station, where she was known as "La Dama del Bastón de Cristal" (The Lady of the Crystal Cane) for the elegant cane she used. She became one of Mexico's most important bolero singers and also achieved great popularity in Cuba. Her hit singles were released by RCA Víctor Records, and she also recorded a studio album with Orfeón Records.

Campos ventured into acting in films such as La isla de la pasión (1942), La mujer sin alma (1944), and Del rancho a la televisión (1953).

Campos remained active as a singer until 1982.

Personal life 
In 1982, Campos died of a sudden death in Mexico City, Mexico.

Discography

Singles

Studio albums 
 Cosas del ayer (Orfeón, 1965)

Compilation albums 
 Chela Campos (De Colección, 1990)

Filmography 
 1942 Virgen de medianoche

References

External links
 
 Chela Campos at AllMusic

1922 births
1982 deaths
Actresses from Mexico City
Bolero singers
Mexican film actresses
RCA Victor artists
Singers from Mexico City
20th-century Mexican women singers